Harry Dale (February 1908 or 15 February 1909 – fourth ¼ 1970), also known by the nicknames of "Squibber" (at school due to his short height) and later "Scrubber" (following a mishearing and misprinting of "Squibber"), was an English professional rugby league footballer who played in the 1920s and 1930s.

Background
Harry Dale was born in Kingston upon Hull, East Riding of Yorkshire, England, he was a pupil at Buckingham Street School (now Buckingham Primary Academy), Kingston upon Hull, he worked as a stevedore at the Port of Hull, he sustained a serious head injury while working with a Royal Engineers bomb disposal unit during World War II, he experienced ill-health in later life and following several spells in hospital, he died aged 61–62 in Kingston upon Hull, East Riding of Yorkshire, England.

Playing career

International honours
Harry Dale was selected to play against Australia during the 1933–34 Kangaroo tour of Great Britain, but he had to withdraw due to a knee injury.

County honours
Harry Dale won 7-caps for Yorkshire while at Hull Kingston Rovers.

County Cup Final appearances
Harry Dale played  and scored a try in the Hull Kingston Rovers' 13–7 victory over Hunslet F.C. in the 1929–30 Yorkshire County Cup Final during the 1929–30 season at Headingley Rugby Stadium, Leeds on Saturday 30 November 1929, in front of a crowd of 11,000.

Club career
Harry Dale transferred from Newtown ARLFC to the Hull Kingston Rovers, he made his début for the Hull Kingston Rovers, he played  against Hunslet F.C. at Parkside, Hunslet on Saturday 27 March 1926, he played his last match for the Hull Kingston Rovers, and scored a try against Leigh at Mather Lane (adjacent to the Bridgewater Canal), Leigh on Saturday 3 September 1938, and he transferred from Hull Kingston Rovers to Newcastle RLFC.

Testimonial match
A joint benefit season/testimonial match at Hull Kingston Rovers against Bramley during the 1937–38 season was shared by; Harry Dale and Jack Spamer, during April 1938 each player received £84 (based on increases in average earnings, this would be approximately £14,030 in 2018).

References

External links
Search for "Dale" at rugbyleagueproject.org
Search for "Harry Dale" at britishnewspaperarchive.co.uk
Search for "Scrubber Dale" at britishnewspaperarchive.co.uk

1900s births

1970 deaths
Year of birth uncertain
English rugby league players
Hull Kingston Rovers players
Newcastle RLFC players
Place of death missing
Rugby league five-eighths
Rugby league halfbacks
Rugby league players from Kingston upon Hull
Yorkshire rugby league team players
British Army personnel of World War II
Royal Engineers soldiers